Elchin Rahimli (born 4 June 1996) is an Azerbaijani footballer who plays as a midfielder for Sabail in the Azerbaijan Premier League.

Club career
On 10 November 2018, Rahimli made his debut in the Azerbaijan Premier League for Sabail match against Sabah.

References

External links
 

1996 births
Living people
Association football midfielders
Azerbaijani footballers
Azerbaijan Premier League players
Qarabağ FK players
Sabail FK players